Khamis Al-Ajmani (Arabic:خميس العجماني) (born 4 March 1982) is an Emirati footballer. He currently plays for  Ras Al Khaima .

External links

References

Emirati footballers
1982 births
Living people
Al-Nasr SC (Dubai) players
Sharjah FC players
Al-Ittihad Kalba SC players
Hatta Club players
Ras Al Khaimah Club players
UAE First Division League players
UAE Pro League players
Association football fullbacks